Jurjen Jacob (Jurrie) Koolhof (10 January 1960 – 28 January 2019) was a Dutch international football striker and manager.

As a player, Koolhof had a long and productive career, with 190 league goals. He played for a number of clubs in the Netherlands including Vitesse Arnhem, F.C. Groningen, De Graafschap and PSV Eindhoven. For the latter he scored a total of 69 goals in 106 appearances and had an effective partnership with Norway's Hallvar Thoresen in the mid-1980s.

Club career 

He began his career at the local pride BV Veendam, breaking into the first-team squad in 1978. He began scoring prolifically in the late 1980s, thus attracting attention. He was transferred to Vitesse Arnhem in 1980, the same year they were relegated from the Eredivisie (first) to the Erste (second) Divisie. In his second season in Arnhem he managed to score 19 goals in 16 appearances, an exceptional average of 1.2 goals per match. During the 1981/82 transfer window he signed a contract at PSV Eindhoven, his first Eredivisie club.

His first years in the lichtstad (city of light) were successful. He adapted quickly to the top-tier professional level and, over two and a half years, missed few matches. However, in 1984 he suffered an injury that left him unable to play for two full years. In the 1986/87 season he returned to the pitch, although he never fully recovered. He played professional football for another seven years, mainly in the Eerste Divisie. After continuing to play on FC Groningen, Vitesse Arnhem and De Graafschap he ended his career where it had once started, with BV Veendam.

National team career 

He first played for the Netherlands on 14 August 1982 against Greece. After the 46 minute mark he replaced Piet Wildschut. At the time there were not any goals scored, but a goal by Edo Ophof in 54th minute would cause Oranje to win the game.

He was capped only 5 times, scoring zero goals. As a result, he did not enjoy a long international career. He played his last international match on 16 February 1983, just over 9 months after his first international appearance. This last match was the Euro 1984 qualifier against Spain, resulting in a 1–0 loss.

Coaching career 

After he quit playing Doetinchem became his new domicile. He acted alternately as head of the youth academy and manager of De Graafschap from 1994 to 2002. He was Hennie Spijkerman's assistant for one season at FC Emmen. In the following years he was employed at AGOVV Apeldoorn, FC Dordrecht and MVV as manager. Koolhof was fired from his job on 19 February 2007 due to disappointing results, strikingly on the same day Cambuur Leeuwarden let go their trainer Roy Wesseling. On 15 March the 47-year-old Koolhof signed a two-year contract at SC Cambuur-Leeuwarden, taking effect 1 July 2007. Gerrie Schouwenaar, who acted as interim manager, departed for Qatar. His spot was taken by Alfons Arts, who became Koolhof's assistant manager as well as a youth trainer. In his first year his team surprised everyone by defeating AZ Alkmaar in the Cup (1–0). After a few matches in the 2008–2009 season, Koolhof was sacked following a poor overall start to the season.

Personal life 

Jurrie Koolhof was married and had two sons, football player Dean Koolhof and tennis pro Wesley Koolhof.
He died after a long illness at 59 years.

Statistics

Player

Manager

Honours 

With PSV
Eredivisie (Dutch league) : 1985/1986, 1986/1987

With Vitesse Arnhem
Eerste Divisie (Dutch first division) : 1988/1989

With De Graafschap
Eerste Divisie (Dutch first division) :  1990/1991

See also 

 KNVB Cup 2007-08
 Eerste Divisie 2007-08

References

External links 
 Video of Koolhof's most famous attempt on goal on YouTube
  2006 Interview on the official MVV Maastricht website 

1960 births
2019 deaths
Dutch footballers
Association football forwards
Netherlands international footballers
Dutch football managers
SC Veendam players
SBV Vitesse players
PSV Eindhoven players
FC Groningen players
De Graafschap players
Eerste Divisie players
Eredivisie players
De Graafschap managers
AGOVV Apeldoorn managers
FC Dordrecht managers
MVV Maastricht managers
SC Cambuur managers
People from Oldambt (municipality)
Footballers from Groningen (province)